Gavmishan (also Romanized as Gāvmīshān; also known as Bīsheh-ye Doshākh-e Bālā, Gāvmīshī, and Qal‘eh-ye Gāvmīshān) is a village in Sofla Rural District, in the Central District of Kharameh County, Fars Province, Iran. At the 2006 census, its population was 174, in 45 families.

References 

Populated places in Kharameh County